The Wailuku River is a  water course on the Island of Hawaii in the Hawaiian Islands. It is the longest river in Hawai'i and the largest in the state by mean discharge. Its course lies mostly along the divide between the lava flows  of Mauna Kea and those of Mauna Loa to the south. It arises at about the  elevation along the eastern slope of Mauna Kea. It flows generally eastward, descending steeply from the mountain and entering the Pacific Ocean at Hilo.

Wailuku River State Park is located along the lower reach of the river. One section of the park includes Rainbow Falls, and another section Peepee falls and an area called the Boiling Pots (a series of small falls and pools).  However, it is also one of the deadliest bodies of water in the state, as the river is not guarded and can behave unpredictably.

The lower reach of the river is used for the generation of hydroelectricity. The flow at Hilo averages 275 cubic feet per second (8 m³/s) with peak flows 40 times as great. Water flow is monitored by the USGS.

The river has been the site of sewage leaks and is the subject of water quality research.  Water advisories are posted online by the State of Hawaii. There is a plan for restoration of the Hilo Bay watershed that includes characterization of the Wailuku River.

In the Hawaiian language, wai means fresh water and luku means destruction, so it means essentially River of Destruction. The river can rise into the trees and drop back down very fast. The high flood marks can be seen dated in concrete, on the stairs going down to the river behind the Hilo Public Library.

According to legend, the river was created in a battle between the god Maui and the lizard monster Kuna.

The river is rated Class 5 white water and has been navigated by experts on kayak.

References

External links
 USGS flow data
NPS: Rivers and Trails of Hawaii
USGS: Wailuku River

Bodies of water of Hawaii (island)
Rivers of Hawaii